Land cruiser or landcruiser may refer to:

 Studebaker Land Cruiser
 Toyota Land Cruiser, the full-size branch of Toyota's Land Cruiser range
 Toyota Land Cruiser Prado, or Toyota Prado, the mid-size branch of Toyota's Land Cruiser range
 Land battleship, aka land cruiser, land ironclad
 an armoured combat vehicle, a tank
 A literal translation of the German Landkreuzer, which referred to superheavy tank designs
 the Landkreuzer P. 1000 Ratte 
 the Landkreuzer P. 1500 Monster
 Land Ship, a nickname for British heavy tanks of World War I
In Harry Turtledove's Worldwar series, a landcruiser is an army tank.

See also

 Landship (disambiguation)
 Land ironclad